Human Error is an album by British band Unseen Terror. It was originally released in December 1987, and re-released in 2001 with six bonus tracks.

Track listing
  "Unseen Terror"   – 3:34
  "Oblivion Descends"  – 2:20
  "Divisions"  – 1:50
  "Death Sentence (Of the Innocent)"  – 2:18
  "Nermal"  – 0:11
  "Ignorant Scene"  – 1:38
  "Uninformed"  – 2:02
  "Expulsion of Wrath"  – 1:44
  "Garfield for President"  – 0:43
  "Burned beyond Recognition"  – 1:19
  "Winds of Pestilence"  – 1:28
  "Hysteria"  – 1:41
  "In a Shallow Grave"  – 0:58
  "Odie's Revenge"  – 0:16
  "Deliverance"  – 2:19
  "The End Product"  – 2:20
  "To Live and Learn"  – 1:34
  "Charred Remains"  – 1:18
  "Beyond Eternity"  – 3:27
  "Garfield Strikes Again"  – 2:18
  "Beyond Eternity" (2001 bonus track) – 3:13
  "Expulsion of Wrath" (2001 bonus track) – 1:37
  "Scarred" (2001 bonus track) – 0:49
  "Walls" (2001 bonus track) – 0:42
  "Human Error" (2001 bonus track) – 2:11
  "Within Without" (2001 bonus track) – 1:23

Credits 
 Shane Embury - drums
 Mitch Dickinson - vocals, guitar, bass

References

1987 albums
Unseen Terror albums
Earache Records albums